Codex Tischendorfianus II – designated by Uncial 081 (in the Gregory-Aland numbering) α 1023 (Soden), – is a Greek uncial manuscript of the New Testament, dated paleographically to the 6th century.

Description 

The codex contains a small part of the Second Epistle to the Corinthians 1:20-2:12 on 2 parchment leaves ( by ). The text is written in two columns per page, 18 lines per page, in a large uncial letters. It is elegantly written, without breathings and accents. It uses diaeresis (Ϊ and Ϋ).

This manuscript was a part of the same codex to which Uncial 0285 belonged.

The Greek text of this codex was influenced by the Alexandrian text-type with some alien readings. Aland placed it in Category II.

In 2 Corinthians 2:2 it contains reading και τις εστιν (as א2 D F G Ψ) for και τις (as א* A B C 81).

History 
Biblical scholar Constantin von Tischendorf brought this codex from the East to Petersburg in 1859. Tischendorf briefly described it in Notitia editionis codicis Bibliorum Sinaitici (Leipzig, 1860). It was examined by Eduard de Muralt, by Kurt Treu and by Pasquale Orsini.

Currently it is dated by the INTF to the 6th century.

The codex is now is located at the Russian National Library (Gr. 9) in Saint Petersburg.

See also 
 List of New Testament uncials
 Biblical manuscript
 Textual criticism

References

Further reading 
 C. von Tischendorf, Notitia editionis codicis Bibliorum Sinaitici (Leipzig 1860), p. 50.
 Kurt Treu, Die Griechischen Handschriften des Neuen Testaments in der USSR; eine systematische Auswertung des Texthandschriften in Leningrad, Moskau, Kiev, Odessa, Tbilisi und Erevan, T & U 91 (Berlin: 1966), pp. 24–25.

Greek New Testament uncials
6th-century biblical manuscripts
Codex Tischendorfianus II